Escurolles is a former canton of the arrondissement of Vichy, Allier, Auvergne, France. It was disbanded following the French canton reorganisation which came into effect in March 2015. It had 21,155 inhabitants (2012).

Communes
The canton consisted of the following communes:

Bellerive-sur-Allier
Broût-Vernet
Brugheas
Charmeil
Cognat-Lyonne
Escurolles
Espinasse-Vozelle
Hauterive
Saint-Didier-la-Forêt
Saint-Pont
Saint-Rémy-en-Rollat
Serbannes
Vendat

See also
Cantons of the Allier department

References

Escurolles
2015 disestablishments in France
States and territories disestablished in 2015